Pooja Thakur (born 24 February 1990) is an Indian professional international kabaddi player. She was member of the India national kabaddi team that won Asian gold medals in 2014 in Incheon.

References

Living people
1990 births
Indian kabaddi players
Asian Games medalists in kabaddi
Kabaddi players at the 2014 Asian Games
Asian Games gold medalists for India
Medalists at the 2014 Asian Games